Peter Brooke Cadogan Fenwick (born 25 May 1935) is a neuropsychiatrist and neurophysiologist who is known for his studies of epilepsy and end-of-life phenomena.

Education
Fenwick is a graduate of Trinity College, Cambridge, where he studied Natural Science. He obtained his clinical experience at St Thomas' Hospital.

Career
Fenwick is a senior lecturer at King's College, London, where he works as a consultant at the Institute of Psychiatry. He is the Consultant Neuropsychologist at both the Maudsley, and John Radcliffe hospitals, and also provides services for Broadmoor Hospital. He works with the Mental Health Group at the University of Southampton, and holds a visiting professorship at the Riken Neurosciences Institute in Japan.

Fenwick is the president of the Horizon Research Foundation, an organisation that supports research into end-of-life experiences. He is the President of the British branch of the International Association for Near-Death Studies. As of 2008 Fenwick is a part of the Human Consciousness Project. The first study from the project was called The AWARE (AWAreness during REsuscitation) study and was published in 2014.

Fenwick has been part of the editorial board for a number of journals, including the Journal of Neurology, Neurosurgery, and Psychiatry, the Journal of Consciousness Studies and the Journal of Epilepsy and Behaviour.

Near-death research
Fenwick's interest in near-death experiences was piqued when he read Raymond Moody's book Life After Life. Initially skeptical of Moody's anecdotal evidence, Fenwick reassessed his opinion after a discussion with one of his own patients, who described a near-death experience very similar to that of Moody's subjects. Since then, he has collected and analysed more than 300 examples of near-death experiences.

He has been criticised by some in the medical community for arguing that human consciousness can survive bodily death. Fenwick argues that human consciousness may be more than just a function of the brain.

The plain fact is that none of us understands these phenomena. As for the soul and life after death, they are still open questions, though I myself suspect that NDEs are part of the same continuum as mystical experiences.

Fenwick and his wife are co-authors of The Art of Dying, a study of the spiritual needs of near-death patients. The Fenwicks argue that modern medical practices have devalued end-of-life experiences, and call for a more holistic approach to death and dying. In 2003, Fenwick and Sam Parnia appeared in the BBC documentary "The Day I Died". In the documentary Parnia and Fenwick discussed their belief that research from near-death experiences indicates the mind is independent of the brain. According to psychologist and lecturer Susan Blackmore the documentary misled viewers with beliefs that are rejected by the majority of scientists. Blackmore criticized the documentary for biased and "dishonest reporting".

Fenwick and Parnia have claimed that research from NDEs may show the "mind is still there after the brain is dead". The neurologist Michael O'Brien has written "most people would not find it necessary to postulate such a separation between mind and brain to explain the events," and suggested that further research is likely to provide a physical explanation for near-death experiences. Robert Todd Carroll has written that Fenwick has made metaphysical assumptions and dismissed possible psychological and physiological explanations for near-death experiences.

Personal life
Fenwick's interests include hill-walking and fishing. He is married to Elizabeth Fenwick, who co-authors many of his books.

Selected bibliography

With Elizabeth Fenwick
 The Art of Dying (Continuum, 2008)
 Past Lives: An Investigation into Reincarnation Memories (Berkley, 2001)
 The Hidden Door: Understanding and Controlling Dreams (Berkley Publishing Group, 1999)
 The Truth in the Light: An Investigation of Over 300 Near-Death Experiences (Berkley Trade, 1997)
 Living with Epilepsy (Bloomsbury, 1996)

References

External links
The Truth in Light Book Review by Anthony Campbell
Peter Fenwick's YouTube Channel

1935 births
Academics of King's College London
Alumni of Trinity College, Cambridge
Living people
Neuropsychologists
Neurophysiology
Near-death experience researchers
Parapsychologists